Blaster Master: Enemy Below, known in Japan as , is a video game for the Game Boy Color.  It was also re-released for the Virtual Console on the Nintendo 3DS system in 2011.

Gameplay and premise

Blaster Master: Enemy Below puts players in control of Jason and Sophia, a human and a vehicle respectively. It is set after the events of preceding titles in the series' timeline. It features areas with the same visual scheme as areas in the first Blaster Master game and also reuses sprites from it. The layouts of each area is different from the original. Enemy Below features both sidescrolling and overhead gameplay, the latter taking place in dungeons that players find while exploring the sidescrolling portion. These portions are typically put players in control of Sophia or Jason respectively, though Jason can exit Sophia during the sidescrolling portion. In the overhead portions, players can only control Jason in four directions. Unlike Blaster Master where players could skip most dungeons, Enemy Below adds a key that is hidden in one of these dungeons that is required to fight the boss of the area. Players collect upgrades for both Jason and Sophia.

The premise of the Japanese version is entirely different than that of the English version. Players instead control Leonardo Gardner, who is tasked with eliminating invading monsters.

Development
Blaster Master: Enemy Below was developed by Sunsoft's United Kingdom development studio. It was released on February 24, September 24, and October 27 in 2000 in Japan, North America, and Europe respectively. It was re-released for the Nintendo 3DS' Virtual Console service in 2011.

Reception

The game received favorable reviews according to the review aggregation website GameRankings. Game Informer praised it for how it brought the series back, noting its length and difficulty as positives. Both Hardcore Gaming 101 and IGN felt it was a solid entry in the series, but lamented that it did not offer much new for it. IGN also felt that fans of the series would enjoy it, though noted that it was difficult to the point of frustration. They added that it was "probably the game [they] were asked most about" after opening IGN Pocket. The 3DS release in particular was noted by IGN as the definitive version due to the presence of save states. Despite criticism for feeling too similar to the original game, Allgame felt that the additions were adequate to set it apart. However, they felt that the overhead portions were a downside of the game due to its controls. GameSpot praised the addition of a password save function and added weaponry. They also found the visuals to be of high quality, noting that it was "hard to believe" that these are Game Boy Color graphics. Official Nintendo Magazine felt that it would appeal to people who enjoy difficult games, but that many will be turned off by it. They also criticized the game for its overhead controls, finding them difficult and frustrating. Digitally Downloaded felt it was dull, stating that it copies Metroid without copying its charm. They also criticized it for a lacking story and soundtrack.

References

External links

2000 video games
Sunsoft games
Game Boy Color games
Metroidvania games
Run and gun games
Video games developed in Japan
Virtual Console games
Single-player video games
Blaster Master
Virtual Console games for Nintendo 3DS